The Lord Howe Island Board is a NSW Statutory Authority established under the Lord Howe Island Act, 1953, to administer Lord Howe Island, an unincorporated island territory within the jurisdiction of the State of New South Wales, Australia, in the Tasman Sea between Australia and New Zealand. It comprises seven members, of whom four are directly elected by the island population, and reports directly to the New South Wales Minister for Environment and Heritage, and is responsible for the care, control and management of the island.

Responsibilities
Its duties include the:
 protection of World Heritage values
 control of development
 administration of Crown Land, including the island’s protected area, the Permanent Park Preserve
 provision of community services and infrastructure
 delivery of sustainable tourism

The Lord Howe Island Regulation 2014 give effect to the LHI Act by establishing measures for administration including: Board elections, licensing of businesses, environment protection, sale and consumption of alcohol, and placed the board under the provisions of the Local Government Act 1993.

Composition
Since 2004 the Board has comprised seven members, four of whom are elected from the islander community, thus giving the approximately 350 permanent residents a high level of autonomy. The remaining three members (including the Chairperson) are appointed by the Minister of whom:

One appointee must represent the interests of business and tourism.
One appointee must represent the interests of conservation.
One appointee must be an employee of the Department of Planning and Environment.

The full Board meets quarterly on the island while the day-to-day affairs of the island are managed by the Board’s administration which operates in a similar manner to a local government authority in New South Wales, with a permanent staff of 50 led by a Chief Executive Officer.

Legislative history
The Board dates back to 1913, when the Sydney-based Lord Howe Island Board of Control was formed to replace a single magistrate appointed by the NSW Government. The Lord Howe Island Board of Control comprised three members appointed by the Chief Secretary of New South Wales, mostly to regulate the palm seed industry, but also administering the affairs of the island from Sydney until the present Lord Howe Island Board was set up in 1954.

The Lord Howe Island Board commenced operations from 23 April 1954 and comprised five members appointed by the Chief Secretary. The members included the Under Secretary of the Chief Secretary's Department (as Chairman), the responsible Member of Parliament (the Member of the Legislative Assembly for King until 1973), a nominee of the Secretary for Lands (in practice the Under Secretary of the Department of Lands), and two appointed members from the Lord Howe Island Advisory Committee.

In 1981, the Lord Howe Island Amendment Act gave islanders the administrative power of three elected members on a five-member board. Under the Lord Howe Island Amendment Act, 2004, the board now comprises seven members, four of whom are elected from the islander community.

Chairs

References

External links
Lord Howe Island Board
Lord Howe Island Act, 1953

Lord Howe Island
Government agencies of New South Wales
1954 establishments in Australia
Organizations established in 1954